F89 or F-89 may refer to:

 Aradu (F89), a 1980 Nigerian frigate
 DKW F89, a 1950 compact front wheel drive saloon
 F89 Minimi, an Australian produced version of the FN Minimi light machine gun
 F89 strain, a mupirocin-resistant strain of Staphylococcus aureus
 HMCS Prince David (F89), a 1929 Canadian National Steamships passenger liner
 HMS Battleaxe (F89), a 1977 British Royal Navy Type 22 frigate
 Northrop F-89 Scorpion, an early American jet-powered fighter 
 Reynard F89 from Reynard Motorsport
 Volvo F89, heavy-duty truck from Volvo